is a Japanese alternative manga magazine. It was first published in 1998 and is released every two months by the publishing house Seirinkogeisha. As of November 2021, 143 issues have been published.

The magazine was founded after the manga magazine Garo faced a crisis in 1996 after editor Katsuichi Nagai's death. Several of Garo's key staff quit their work with Garo and instead founded AX in 1998. Several of Garo's regular contributors moved to AX instead.

In October 2008, North American publisher Top Shelf announced that it will release a 400-page selection of underground manga stories from the magazine as an anthology called AX Collection, edited by Sean Michael Wilson. The volume was nominated for "Best American Edition of Foreign Material" at the 2011 Harvey Awards.

Published series 
AX has featured manga artists such as Suehiro Maruo, Shintaro Kago, Shinichi Abe, Nishioka Kyoudai, Naoto Yamakawa, Usamaru Furuya, Toshio Saeki, Akino Kondoh, Kotobuki Shiriagari, Yoshihiro Tatsumi, and Toyo Kataoka.

The magazine featured, among others, these series:

 Doing Time by Kazuichi Hanawa (1998-2000)
 Tokyo Zombie by Yusaku Hakanuma (1999)
 Jacaranda by Kotobuki Shiriagari 
 Suiton Kikou by Shinya Komatsu (2004)

References

External links 
 Ax
 

Manga anthologies
Top Shelf Productions titles